The Black Forest Costume Museum is a museum in the convent building of the former Capuchin abbey in Haslach im Kinzigtal in the Baden-Württemberg county of Ortenaukreis in south Germany.

The museum was opened in 1980 in the renovated buildings of the abbey. It portrays the history and development of traditional folk costume in the Black Forest and its surrounding regions.

Exhibits 
The museum houses some of the most important original costumes from the following regions:

 Central Black Forest
 Southern Black Forest
 Northern Black Forest (Foothills on the Upper Rhine Plain)
 Black Forest perimeter
 Ried
 Breisgau
 Markgräflerland

Over 100 life-size figures are displayed with many charming details for special occasions and from everyday.

Influenced by the respective zeitgeist and fashion trends, by prosperity, poverty and denominational ties, the individual costumes of the Black Forest in the 18th century all have their own twist.

Themes 
 Bonnets and hats, e. g. the Bollenhut
 Bridal crowns (Schäppel )
 Civic dress
 Work clothing

The Old Capuchin abbey 
The old Capuchin monastery (built 1630–32), which houses this collection of costumes, is the only completely preserved baroque monastery of the Capuchin order in all of southern Germany.

References

External links 
Black Forest Costume Museum

Coordinates

Photo gallery 

Folk costumes
Museums in Baden-Württemberg
Tourist attractions in Baden-Württemberg
Buildings and structures in Ortenaukreis
Folk museums in Germany
Black Forest
Costume museums
Culture of Baden-Württemberg
Museums established in 1980